Capitol School of Hairstyling & Esthetics (Capitol School of Hair Design) is a nationally accredited Cosmetology and Esthetics school located in Omaha, Nebraska. It was founded in 1923.   

Capitol School of Hairstyling & Esthetics is a member of the Omaha Chamber of Commerce and accredited by the Better Business Bureau of Nebraska. The school is approved by the Nebraska State Board of Education, accredited by the National Accrediting Commission of Cosmetology Arts and Sciences (NACCAS), and licensed by the Nebraska State Board of Cosmetology.

Eric Hahn won the title "World's Tallest Mohawk" from Guinness Book of World Records on November 14, 2008 at Capitol School.

Lyal McCaig, the owner and Director of Education for Capitol, was named "Legend of Hair" by Omaha Magazine shortly before he died in 2007.

References

External links
 Official website

Hairstyles
Hairdressing
Education in Omaha, Nebraska
Technical schools
Skin care